Ivan Vargić (born 15 March 1987) is a Croatian footballer who plays as a goalkeeper for Krk. He had played for Slovenian club FC Koper in the years before returning to Croatia.

Club career

Osijek
Following two loans to HNK Vukovar '91 in Croatia's 2. HNL and FC Honka in Finland's Veikkausliiga, Vargić made his debut with NK Osijek in 1. HNL in April 2009. He earned 36 league caps before he left the club in 2013.

Rijeka
On 5 February 2013, HNK Rijeka announced that they have signed Vargić on a -year contract. During the 2015–16 1. HNL season, Vargić broke two Rijeka records: the longest streak without conceding a goal and goalkeeper who kept most clean sheets in one season. From 2 August 2015 to 4 October 2015, he did not concede a goal for 783 consecutive minutes, which is the second longest streak in the history of 1. HNL. During the 2015–16 1. HNL season, he conceded only 13 goals in 32 appearances, keeping 21 clean sheets. With 23 appearances, Vargić is also the club's most capped goalkeeper in Europe.

Lazio
On 1 February 2016, both Croatian and Italian press reported that Lazio have signed Vargić for a fee of €2.7 million. Lazio immediately sent Vargić on loan to Rijeka until 30 June 2016.

Loan to Anorthosis Famagusta
On 3 September 2018, Vargić joined Cypriot club Anorthosis Famagusta on a season-long loan.

Loan to Koper
On 6 February 2020, he joined Koper in Slovenia on loan until the end of the 2019–20 season.

International career
Vargić was a member of Croatia under-21 national team. On 12 November 2014, he made his senior national team debut in a friendly game against Argentina, entering as a substitute for Lovre Kalinić. Vargić went on to cap his national side for two more times, and the last match of his national career being against Northern Ireland in 2016.

Honours
Rijeka
Croatian Cup: 2014
Croatian Super Cup: 2014

Lazio
Supercoppa Italiana: 2017

References

External links
 

1987 births
Living people
Sportspeople from Osijek
Association football goalkeepers
Croatian footballers
Croatia youth international footballers
Croatia under-21 international footballers
Croatia international footballers
UEFA Euro 2016 players
NK Osijek players
HNK Vukovar '91 players
FC Honka players
HNK Rijeka players
S.S. Lazio players
Anorthosis Famagusta F.C. players
FC Koper players
NK Krk players
Croatian Football League players
Serie A players
Cypriot First Division players
Slovenian Second League players
Slovenian PrvaLiga players
Croatian expatriate footballers
Expatriate footballers in Finland
Expatriate footballers in Italy
Expatriate footballers in Cyprus
Expatriate footballers in Slovenia
Croatian expatriate sportspeople in Finland
Croatian expatriate sportspeople in Italy
Croatian expatriate sportspeople in Cyprus
Croatian expatriate sportspeople in Slovenia